Brothers of Metal is a Swedish heavy metal band formed in 2012 from Falun, Sweden. Their first album Prophecy of Ragnarök was released in November 2017. The band consists of three vocalists (two male, one female), three guitar players, a bass player, and a drummer. The band's visual style and lyrics are inspired by Vikings and Norse mythology, and are often purposefully over-the-top, which earns them both criticism and praise.

History 
Brothers of Metal formed in 2012 with a vision to create "true metal," when a night of drinking led to the creation of their first song, "I am the son of Odin."  They self-released their debut album Prophecy of Ragnarök in 2017, and their second album Emblas Saga was released in 2020.

Discography

Albums 

 2017 – Prophecy of Ragnarök
 2020 – Emblas Saga

Singles 

 2018 – Prophecy of Ragnarök
 2018 – Yggdrasil
 2018 – Fire, Blood and Steel
 2019 – The Mead Song
 2019 – Njord
 2019 – One
 2020 – Hel
 2021 – Chain Breaker
 2022 – The Other Son of Odin
 2022 – Berserkir

Members 
The eight-member band dresses as a group of Viking warriors, with their names and roles being listed on their website.
 Joakim Lindbäck Eriksson – lead vocals "battle cries"
 Ylva Eriksson – lead vocals "voice of the Valkyries"
 Mats Nilsson – growl, speaker "tongue of the gods"
 Emil Wärmedal – bass guitar "lute of heavy thunder"
 Mikael Fehrm – guitar "lute of lightning"
 Pähr Nilsson – guitar "lute of lightning"
 Dawid Grahn – guitar "lute of lightning"
 Johan Johansson – drums "anvil and war drums"

References

External links 

 Official Website
 Brothers of Metal Official Facebook Page
 Brothers of Metal AFM Records

Swedish power metal musical groups
2012 establishments in Sweden
Musical groups established in 2012
AFM Records artists